Deir Ez Zahrani is a populated area in southern Lebanon.

History
In 1875 Victor Guérin noted:  "[Deir Zaharany is] located on a hill, has a population of 100 Métualis, to which must be added about twenty Christians. It succeeded an ancient locality, as evidenced by several fragments of scattered columns here and there and a number of ashlars embedded in a ruined mosque and in private houses. It was in one of these dwellings that was found in 1861, and brought back to the khan of Saida, an ancient funerary cippe, with palm, crown and lemnisque, and whose Greek inscription was reproduced by Mr. Renan."

References

Bibliography

External links
Deir Ez Zahrani, Localiban

Populated places in Nabatieh District
Shia Muslim communities in Lebanon